The spacecraft cemetery, known more formally as the South Pacific Ocean(ic) Uninhabited Area, is a region in the southern Pacific Ocean east of New Zealand, where spacecraft that have reached the end of their usefulness are routinely crashed. The area is roughly centered on "Point Nemo", the oceanic pole of inaccessibility, the location farthest from any land.

The defunct space station Mir and six Salyut stations are among those that have been ditched there. Other spacecraft that have been routinely scuttled in the region include various cargo spacecraft to the International Space Station, including Russian Progress cargo craft, the Japan Aerospace Exploration Agency H-II Transfer Vehicle, and the European Space Agency's Automated Transfer Vehicle. A total of more than 263 spacecraft were disposed in this area between 1971 and 2016. The International Space Station is slated to end up in the spacecraft cemetery upon "retirement".

Current considerations of the spacecraft cemetery include the environmental impact it creates on marine life within the South Pacific Ocean Uninhabited Region. This region is beyond legal jurisdiction of any country, hence faces less regulation. Currently two treaties outline certain laws that can be applied to the spacecraft cemetery. The Outer Space Treaty produced by the United Nations reflects on damages caused by spacecraft on opposing nations. The United Nations Convention on the Law of the Sea reflects on general marine pollution. Marine pollution can be caused by spillage of the highly toxic rocket propellant hydrazine. Other forms of space debris removal are being considered and produced to slow the exponential growth of space debris orbiting Earth due to increased space exploration.

Purpose 
Earth's spacecraft cemetery is used as a site for spacecraft that have reached their lifetime limit due to fatigue and must be retired. Larger spacecraft too massive to burn up during re-entry into the Earth's atmosphere are controlled to crash / splash down in Earth's spacecraft cemetery, a location in the ocean remote from inhabited regions. The use of this remote location enhances protection of inhabited regions from harm during re-entry and impact. The spacecraft cemetery region contains between 250 and 300 various spacecraft, and has been used by multiple international space exploration organizations, including crafts from China, Russia, and other countries. Currently, the International Space Station is slated to enter the spacecraft cemetery at the end of its lifespan.

Location 
The spacecraft cemetery is located inside the South Pacific Ocean Uninhabited Area, a region in the southern Pacific Ocean to the east of the geographic center of the water hemisphere (near New Zealand's Bounty Islands). The area, roughly centered on "Point Nemo", the oceanic pole of inaccessibility, is furthest away from any land. This location has been chosen for its remoteness and limited shipping traffic so as not to endanger human life with any falling debris.

Incidents 
A total of more than 263 spacecraft were disposed in this area between 1971 and 2016. The defunct space station Mir and six Salyut stations are among the nearly 200 pieces of Russian spacecraft debris in this region, making Russia the largest contributor of spacecraft in the cemetery. The remaining pieces of debris in the cemetery belong to the United States, Europe, Japan, as well as certain private organizations. Among American spacecraft, remnants of the Skylab space station were deposited into the spacecraft cemetery.

The decommissioning of Tiangong-1, the first Chinese space station, was an unsuccessful targeted re-entry at Point Nemo. During an extended mission phase, control was lost due to a power failure, leading to an uncontrolled landing outside of the spacecraft cemetery.

According to the U.S. guidelines dictating which spacecraft pose enough risk to require a controlled landing, it is recommended that the International Space Station undergo a controlled de-orbit at the end of its life. The same is recommended for the Hubble Space Telescope.

Laws 
Disposal of end of life spacecraft into the spacecraft cemetery is not strictly controlled despite frequent disposals into the zone and potential risks of re-entry. Since the South Pacific Ocean Uninhabited Area is beyond the jurisdiction of any country, very few laws restrict the activity of nations within this area. International treaties exist but do not clearly assign responsibility to countries about the liability for damages and pollution caused by re-entering space debris.

Among the pertinent regulations, two general agreements concerning space debris and marine pollution are often expanded upon to govern the spacecraft cemetery.

First, the Outer Space Treaty proposed by the United Nations dictates that each state party is subject to the damages to other state parties caused by part of the registered spacecraft on the Earth, which include the ocean. Therefore, countries are obliged to take action when disposal of registered spacecraft into the ocean causes damages to other parties. However, space debris in the ocean is often left unclaimed.

In the perspective of ocean preservation, the United Nations Convention on the Law of the Sea, also known as Law of the Sea Convention (LOSC), commands that all states have the duty of protecting and preventing marine environment from pollution, even outside the jurisdiction of any state. Nevertheless, this article is only practical when space debris is considered harmful to the marine environment.

Environmental impacts 
With 47% of re-entry mass coming from controlled re-entries, chemical spillage poses a risk to the marine environment. Hydrazine, a widely used rocket propellant that is highly toxic to living organisms, likely partially survives during re-entry. Radioactive chemicals present in spacecraft are also a cause for concern in the industry.

There are numerous domestic and international regulatory bodies intended to mitigate potential environmental damage caused by spacecraft pollution. The United Nations Convention on the Law of the Sea is an international treaty overseeing marine pollution and its contributors. This agreement defines pollution using three conditions: 1) the object must have been introduced into the environment by man, 2) the object contains substances, 3) the object must be detrimental to living organisms. Because it is difficult to know how much of a substance remains after it enters the atmosphere, the potential environmental risk of certain spacecraft entering the cemetery may be unknown, leaving much of the treaty up for interpretation. Additionally, the EPA provides protocols on marine pollution declaring the responsibility for pollution mitigation to those who contribute to it and addresses regional cooperation between nations in order to find the least harmful solutions to debris disposal.

Space debris disposal 

Space debris is any form of man-made object orbiting the Earth that no longer serves a useful function. Currently more than 27,000 pieces of space debris are orbiting earth at high velocities, threatening the safety of human and robotic missions, as well as causing damage to spacecraft. There are few space debris removal processes, one of which is depositing large spacecraft in the spacecraft cemetery on earth, although, due to exhausted maneuvering fuel reserves, in the past this was rarely done.

The most common way to eliminate space debris, when actually done, is to de-orbit crafts, causing them to burn up during re-entry into the Earth's atmosphere due to high velocities and air compression resulting in a temperature increase of air and the craft's surface. Other common and less controlled processes for space removal include allowing the crafts to decay, collide with other objects, or causing them to explode, resulting in smaller pieces of space debris. Currently, new processes for space debris removal are being developed to reduce the exponential growth of space debris orbiting earth, such as nets, magnetized collecting arms, and more.

See also
 Aircraft boneyard
 Atmospheric reentry
 Graveyard orbit
 Ship graveyard
 Space debris
 Wrecking yard
 Space sustainability

References

Pacific Ocean
Space debris
Spacecraft endings
Vehicle graveyards